Heteropsis centralis is a butterfly in the family Nymphalidae. It is found in the Democratic Republic of the Congo, Angola and Zambia.

References

Elymniini
Butterflies described in 1903
Taxa named by Per Olof Christopher Aurivillius
Butterflies of Africa